The Infinite Monkey Cage is a BBC Radio 4 comedy and popular science series. Hosted by physicist Brian Cox and comedian Robin Ince, The Independent described it as a "witty and irreverent look at the world according to science". The show's eighth series was broadcast in June and July 2013 and the podcast, published immediately after the initial radio broadcast, features extended versions of most episodes starting with 1 July 2013 Glastonbury Special episode in Series 8. The programme won a Gold Award in the Best Speech Programme category at the 2011 Sony Radio Awards, and it won the best Radio Talk Show at the 2015 Rose d'Or awards. The name is a reference to the infinite monkey theorem.

Each show has a particular topic up for discussion, with previous topics including the apocalypse and space travel. There are normally three guests; two of these are scientists with an interest in the topic of discussion, offering an expert opinion on the subject. The other guest is usually a comedian, who takes a less serious view of the subject, and often makes the show more accessible by asking the "stupid" questions that the other guests may have overlooked.

Ince and Cox headed an Uncaged Monkeys live tour in 2011, and toured the United States in 2015.

In April 2018 a book titled Infinite Monkey Cage – How to Build a Universe was released. Its audiobook was read by Cox and Ince.

Humour

The programme features a number of running themes and gags. Robin Ince regularly pokes fun at Brian Cox's hair, good looks, and former career as a rock musician. Ince often imitates and quotes Carl Sagan. Cox often ridicules chemistry, astrology and Creationists and occasionally returns to the subject of how and when a strawberry can be considered dead.

Theme song

The programme's theme song was written by Eric Idle and recorded by Idle and Jeff Lynne. Idle and his band performed the song live on the show when it toured in Los Angeles in 2015 and it appears in the 2016 TV show "The Entire Universe".

List of episodes
The following is an episode list of the BBC radio series The Infinite Monkey Cage. As of July 2018, there have been 103 episodes spanning 18 series plus 6 specials; two responding to viewers questions and Christmas Specials in 2014, 2015, 2016 and 2017. All episodes are available to stream via the website and as podcast downloads.

Since 2013, podcasts are longer than the broadcast episodes at around 45 minutes, frequently adding mild spats between Cox and Ince, and occasionally language unsuitable "for the 4:30pm school run slot".

In addition to the regular programmes, a special entitled "An Infinite Monkey's Guide to General Relativity" was broadcast in two half-hour episodes on 8 and 15 December 2015. Their 100th Episode (according to their own manner of counting which differs from the one listed on Wikipedia), simply titled "Monkey Cage 100", was also recorded on Video and is currently watchable on the BBC iPlayer.

Overview

Series One

Series Two

Series Three

Series Four

Series Five

Series Six

Series Seven

Series Eight

Series Nine

Series Ten

Series Eleven

Series Twelve

Year-end specials 
To commemorate the 100th anniversary of Albert Einstein's theory of general relativity, two special episodes were added in December 2015:

Series Thirteen

Series Fourteen

Series Fifteen

Series Sixteen

Series Seventeen

Series Eighteen

Series Nineteen

Moon landing anniversary special 
To commemorate the 50th anniversary of the moon landing, a special episode was added in July 2019:

Series Twenty

Series Twenty One

Series Twenty Two

Series Twenty Three

Series Twenty Four

Series Twenty Five

References

External links

Interview with the presenters

BBC Radio 4 programmes